Budimir Janošević (Serbian Cyrillic: Будимир Јаношевић, ; born 21 October 1989) is a Serbian professional footballer who plays as a goalkeeper for AIK in the Swedish first tier Allsvenskan.

His only appearance for the Serbian national under-21 team came on 18 November 2009 in a friendly match against Denmark U21.

Career

AIK
On 22 November 2017, AIK announced the signing of Janošević on a contract until 31 December 2020. On 23 December 2020, AIK announced that they had extended their contract with Janošević until 31 December 2021. A year later, on 30 December 2021, Janošević extended his contract with AIK until 31 December 2022. On 3 January 2023, Janošević extended his contract again with AIK, this time until 31 December 2024.

Honours
IF Brommapojkarna
 Superettan: 2017

AIK
 Allsvenskan: 2018

References

External links
 Utakmica profile
 Srbijafudbal profile
 

1989 births
Living people
Adana Demirspor footballers
AIK Fotboll players
Allsvenskan players
Association football goalkeepers
Expatriate footballers in Turkey
FK Čukarički players
FK Jagodina players
FK Rad players
FK Spartak Subotica players
FK Teleoptik players
FK Vojvodina players
IF Brommapojkarna players
Serbia under-21 international footballers
Serbian expatriate footballers
Serbian expatriate sportspeople in Turkey
Serbian footballers
Serbian SuperLiga players
Superettan players
Footballers from Belgrade
TFF First League players